Terrence Hooper Samuel (born June 11, 1994) is an American former basketball player. He transferred from the University of Connecticut. He subsequently transferred to Penn State before transferring to USF for his final season.

Samuel was on the Huskies' 2013–14 NCAA Championship team. Following the 2014–15 season, he announced his transfer, ultimately landing at Penn State.

He graduated from Penn State in 2017 and was granted release from their basketball program. He used his final year of eligibility as a graduate student at USF. He averaged 6.6 points and 4.1 rebounds per game.

Without

References

External links
Penn State Nittany Lions bio
UConn Huskies bio

1994 births
Living people
American men's basketball players
Basketball players from New York City
Penn State Nittany Lions basketball players
Point guards
Shooting guards
South Florida Bulls men's basketball players
Sportspeople from Brooklyn
UConn Huskies men's basketball players